Carrizo Springs Consolidated Independent School District is a school district headquartered in Carrizo Springs, Texas (US).

CSCISD serves all of Dimmit County, including the cities of Asherton, Big Wells, and Carrizo Springs. The district also serves several unincorporated areas, including Brundage, Carrizo Hill, and Catarina.

In 2009, the school district was rated "academically acceptable" by the Texas Education Agency.

History
In June 1999, Asherton Independent School District was consolidated into Carrizo Springs Independent School District because the Texas Education Agency found that AISD was not taxing properly. The Asherton Elementary School remained open.

School uniforms
CSCISD requires school uniforms .

Shirts must be purple, gold, or white polo shirts.

Trousers, capris, and skirts may be khaki, navy blue, or black. Denim is only allowed from Pre-Kindergarten through 2nd grade..

Schools

Secondary schools
 Carrizo Springs High School (9–12)
 Carrizo Springs Junior High School (6–8)

Primary schools
 Asherton Elementary School (PreK–6)
 Big Wells Elementary School (PreK–6)
 Carrizo Springs Intermediate School (4–5)
 Carrizo Springs Elementary School (PreK–3)

References

External links
 
 

School districts in Dimmit County, Texas